Hangin' with Mr. Cooper is an American television sitcom that starred Mark Curry as the titular character, an NBA player-turned-substitute teacher/gym coach (and later basketball coach). Holly Robinson played his roommate Vanessa. The show ran for five seasons from 1992 to 1997 on ABC, airing a total of 101 episodes.

Series overview
Broadcast History
 September 1992–July 1993, ABC Tuesday 8:30–9:00
 August 1993–September 1993, ABC Friday 8:30–9:00
 September 1993–March 1994, ABC Friday 9:30–10:00
 May 1994–August 1996, ABC Friday 9:30–10:00
 June 1997–August 1997, ABC Saturday 8:30–9:00
 August 1997, ABC Friday 9:30–10:00

Episodes

Season 1 (1992–1993)

Season 2 (1993–94)

Season 3 (1994–95)

Season 4 (1995–96)

Season 5 (1997)

References

External links
 
 

Hangin' with Mr. Cooper